Perledo (Comasco,) is a comune (municipality) in the Province of Lecco in the Italian region Lombardy, located about  north of Milan and about  northwest of Lecco.

Perledo borders the following municipalities: Bellano, Esino Lario, Menaggio, Parlasco, San Siro, Varenna.

Perledo includes the following "frazione" or hamlets: Tondello, Olivedo, Vezio, Regolo, Bologna, Gisazio, Regoledo, Cestaglia, Gittana, Riva di Gittana, Portone, Panighetto.

Pereldo lies on the east shore of Lake Como, across the lake from the municipality of Menaggio.

Churches
 Church of San Martino (Saint Martin) is the main church of Perledo. The building is impressive, set on the hillside overlooking the lake with tall bell tower and a stone terrace in front. It has a commanding view of Lake Como.

References

External links
 Official website

Cities and towns in Lombardy